Park School may refer to:

United Kingdom
 Park Community School, Havant, England
 Park High School, Stanmore, England
 Stocklake Park Community School (formerly known as Park School), Aylesbury, England
 Park Community School, Barnstaple, England

United States
 Park School of Baltimore, Baltimore County, Maryland
 Park Elementary School (Moorhead, Minnesota), listed in the National Register of Historic Places in Clay County, Minnesota
 Park School (Omaha), Nebraska
 The Park School, Brookline, MA
 Park Elementary School, Natrona County School District in Natrona County, Wyoming

See also
 Roy H. Park School of Communications, Ithaca College in Ithaca, New York, US
 Lindsay Park Elementary School, South Eastern, British Columbia, Canada